James Dickson was an Irish Anglican Dean.

Dickson was born in England. He was Dean of Elphin from 1757 until 1768; and Dean of Down from 1768 unil his death in 1787.

His son was Bishop of Down and Connor from 1784 to until 1804.

References 

Irish Anglicans
1787 deaths
Deans of Elphin
Deans of Down
18th-century English Anglican priests